Jha is a surname of Maithil Brahmins native to the Mithila region of India and Nepal. Notable people with the name include:

A–B 
 Acharya Rameshwar Jha, Sanskrit scholar
 Aditya Jha, Indo-Canadian entrepreneur and philanthropist
 Aditya Narayan Jha, Indian singer, host, actor
 Aditya Nath Jha (1911–1972), Indian Civil Service, recipient of the Padma Vibhushan
 Ajay Jha (1956–2013), Indian cricketer
 Amardeep Jha (born 1960), Indian film and television actress
 Amarnath Jha (c. 1888–1947) Indian academic, university Vice Chancellor
 Amishi Jha, American neuroscientist and professor of psychology
 Anshuman Jha (born 1986), Indian actor
 Anuranjan Jha (born 1977), Indian journalist 
 Anurita Jha (born 1986), Indian actress
 Apoorvanand Jha, Indian professor of Hindi
 Ashish Jha, Dean of Brown University School of Public Health
 Bedanand Jha (died 2006), Nepalese politician
 Bhogendra Jha (died 2009), Indian politician
 Bidhu Jha (born 1942), Canadian politician
 Binodanand Jha (born 1900), Indian politician, Chief Minister of Bihar

C–N
 Chandeshwor Jha, Nepalese politician
 D. N. Jha (born c. 1940), Indian historian and professor
 Durgananda Jha (1941–1963), Nepalese failed assassin
 Ganganath Jha (1842–1971), Sanskrit and philosophy scholar from Bihar
 Gonu Jha (13th century), Indian wit character
 Hetukar Jha (born 1944), Indian author and professor of sociology
 Kamal Nath Jha (1923–2003), Indian freedom fighter, social activist, and politician
 Kanak Jha two-time Olympian (2016 and 2020) and was the 4 times US national champion Table Tennis player
 Kanchinath Jha "Kiran" (1906–1989), Indian Maithili-language writer
 Kaveri Jha (born 1983), Indian film actress
 Komal Jha (born 1987), Indian film actress
 Kranti Prakash Jha, Indian film actor
 Lakshmi Kant Jha (1913–1988), Governor of the Reserve Bank of India
 Manish Jha (born 1978), Indian film director and screenwriter
 Nagendra Nath Jha (born 1935), Indian diplomat and lieutenant governor 
 Narendra Jha (1964–2018), Indian television actor
 Nidhi Jha, Indian television actress

P–R
 Pankaj Jha, Indian actor
 Parmanand Jha (born 1946), Nepalese politician, Vice President of Nepal
 Piyush Jha, Indian director and screenwriter
Prabhat Jha (epidemiologist) (born 1965), Indian-Canadian epidemiologist and health economist
Prabhat Jha (politician) (born 1957), Indian MP and National Vice President of Bharatiya Janata Party
 Prakash Jha (born 1952), Indian film producer, director and screenwriter
 Prayag Jha (born 1945), Indian artist specializing in etching
 Prem Shankar Jha (born 1938), Indian journalist, author and columnist
 Radhanandan Jha (1929–2005), Indian politician from the Congress Party
 Radhika Jha (born 1970), Indian novelist
 Raghunath Jha (born 1939), Indian politician
 Raj Kamal Jha (born 1966), Indian novelist and journalist
 Rajeev Jha (born 1976), Nepalese politician and General Secretary of Nepal Sadbhavana Party
 Ramashreya Jha (1928–2009), Indian composer and teacher of Hindustani classical music
 Ramesh Chandra Jha (1928–1994), Indian poet, novelist and freedom fighter

S–V
 Sanjay Jha (born 1963), Indian businessman and CEO
 Sanjeev Jha (born 1979), Indian politician
 Saurav Jha, Indian commentator on energy and security
 Shriya Jha (born 1986), Indian film and television actress
 Shubhashish Jha (born 8th March 1991), Indian television actor
 Sriram Jha (born 1976), Indian chess grandmaster
 Sriti Jha (born 1986), Indian television actress
 Subhash K. Jha (born 1959), Indian film critic, journalist, editor and film trade analyst
 Sudhanshu Shekhar Jha (born 1940), Indian condensed matter physicist
 Surendra Jha 'Suman' (1910–2002), Indian Maithili-language poet
 Suvarna Jha, Indian television actress
 Tarakant Jha (1927–2014), Indian chairperson of the Bihar Legislative Council
 Udit Narayan Jha (born 1955), Bollywood playback singer
 Vartika Jha (born 2000), Indian dancer, choreographer and actress
 Vikas Kumar Jha, Indian journalist and author
 Vinay Kumar Jha (born 1971), Nepalese cricket umpire

Indian surnames
Hindu surnames
Surnames of Indian origin
Surnames of Nepalese origin
Culture of Bihar
Bihari-language surnames
Mithila
Culture of Mithila